Eslamabad (also Romanized as Eslāmābād) is a village in Bampur-e Sharqi Rural District, in the Central District of Bampur County, Sistan and Baluchestan Province, Iran. At the 2006 census, its population was 74, in 21 families.

References 

Populated places in Bampur County